Paraglenea swinhoei is a species of beetle in the family Cerambycidae. It was described by Henry Walter Bates in 1866. It is known from Taiwan and China.

Subspecies
 Paraglenea swinhoei swinhoei Bates, 1866
 Paraglenea swinhoei continentalis Breuning, 1952

References

Saperdini
Beetles described in 1866